The Divine Comedy Symphony is Robert W. Smith’s first complete symphonic band symphony. It was based on Dante's epic the Divine Comedy. Smith had studied this, and Homer’s Odyssey, at Troy.

The classical symphony consists of four movements – each following a distinct pattern.

Movement One: "Inferno"
"Inferno" was commissioned by the James Madison University Band, and was completely published in 1995. The movement follows the events of the epic poem, using musical references to the events in select cantos of Inferno. An oboe solo in B-flat minor begins the symphony, then, enormous crescendos, violent percussion, and towering blocks of sound quickly lead the audience into Dante’s vision of hell. A furious ostinato is used three times in this piece, first by flutes, then clarinets, and finally by saxophones. In typical overture form, the piece slows down as Dante makes his way down into the very depths of hell. Each of the movements in this symphony have a vocal effect, and in "Inferno", this takes the form of howls of pain, balanced rhythmically with whip cracks. The piece has a coda, and finishes with an extremely difficult timpani solo accompanied by violent and sporadic hits of the gong, although many performances omit this solo and instead have the timpani rolling into silence on a B-flat due to the difficulty. The oboe, piccolo, and timpani feature prominently in this movement.

Movement Two: "Purgatorio"
Also commissioned by the James Madison University Band and published in 1997, "Purgatorio" continues Dante's epic through expressive solos and percussion rhythms. The piece is separated into three main parts: a lilting, dragging theme accented by soprano saxophone and flute solos, the Earthquake (which encompasses most of the piece), and the return of the original melody. Vocalizations occur frequently during this piece, first with certain players "moaning in pain" as they drag heavy loads, then with the chants of "Gloria in Excelsis Deo" during the Earthquake, and finally with singing. During the first and last parts of the piece, most of the band drags their feet on the ground before stomping in a repetitive rhythm. The soprano saxophone is the featured instrument in the piece, playing notable solos that usually herald transitions between parts; this instrument leads the band all the way to the end, as the souls' footsteps gradually fade into the distance. The piece begins in the key of D minor, modulates to C minor for the Earthquake section, and then modulates back to D minor for the conclusion of the piece.

Movement Three: "The Ascension"

Commissioned by the George Mason University Band, "The Ascension" represents Dante's ascension into heaven. The piece follows typical overture form, starting out with Dante looking up to the stars atop Mount Purgatory. A swift horn motif starts Dante's ascension, moving faster than expected. Technically difficult woodwind runs add to the speed of Dante's ascension, as well as loud, dissonant trombone glissandos. The middle of the piece slows down, where the band sings accompanied by bowed vibraphone and pitched wine glasses. The opening theme of the movement is repeated in the woodwinds, while the remainder of the band sings "alleluia". After a short horn solo, the music of the gods and of heaven builds to a climax with a trumpet solo, which is then expanded on by the rest of the band. The music then speeds up again with the same horn motif, finishing with a climactic and dramatic crescendo to the final note, as Dante finally arrives in Heaven. The movement begins in E-flat major, modulates to C minor, then modulates to B-flat major at the trumpet solo. When the horn motif returns, the piece once again modulates to C minor, where it stays for the rest of the piece. This movement prominently features horn, trumpet, and piano.

Movement Four: "Paradiso"
Published in 1996, the final movement of the symphony is a piece filled with emotion and powerful music. The piece uses an extended mallet percussion section to introduce itself, before handing the melody over to the horns in four-part harmony. The vocalization reveals itself quite early in the piece, as the rest of the band sings "ah" to the oboe solo. The mallet percussion cuts off where the timpani begins. The theme from the beginning of "The Ascension" serves as the theme for the final half of the piece. After a modulation, the music rises dramatically into a final suspended note, as Dante finally "glimpses the face of God". A timpani solo accents the sustained note, and rolls into the full band's final, triumphant note. The composer designed the opening of the song to act as Dante's rise into Heaven: with each new beam of light that appears, another mallet percussion part or rhythm is added to the building melody. The piece is the shortest of the four at almost five minutes and is easily the piece that is most filled with raw emotion. It begins in the key of E-flat major, and modulates into the key of F major during the return of the theme from "The Ascension."

References

Compositions by Robert W. Smith
Smith, Robert W. 1
Concert band pieces
Smith, Robert W. 1
Music based on Inferno (Dante)
Works based on Purgatorio
Works based on Paradiso (Dante)